Keeping Up with Lizzie is a 1921 American silent comedy film directed by Lloyd Ingraham and starring Enid Bennett, Edward Hearn and Otis Harlan.

Cast
 Enid Bennett as Lizzie Henshaw
 Edward Hearn as Dan Pettigrew
 Otis Harlan as Sam Henshaw
 Lila Leslie as Mrs. Warburton
 Landers Stevens as 'Soc' Potter 
 Leo White as Count Louis Roland
 Victory Bateman as Mrs. Henshaw
 Harry Todd as Mr. Pettigrew

References

Bibliography
 Munden, Kenneth White. The American Film Institute Catalog of Motion Pictures Produced in the United States, Part 1. University of California Press, 1997.

External links
 

1921 films
1921 drama films
1920s English-language films
American silent feature films
American drama films
Films directed by Lloyd Ingraham
Films distributed by W. W. Hodkinson Corporation
1920s American films
Silent American drama films